The Finnøy Tunnel or Finnøy Fixed Link is an undersea road tunnel in the municipality of Stavanger in Rogaland county, Norway. It connects the island of Finnøy to the nearby island of Rennesøy, and ultimately to the city of Stavanger on the mainland.

Located on County Road 519, the tunnel opened on 30 October 2009 and cost . The Talgje branch of the tunnel is part of County Road 606. The Talgje branch is slightly steeper, with a maximum grade of 10.2%. The main tunnel is two lanes, but the Talgje branch is only one lane wide, with passing areas that are slightly wider.

References

Road tunnels in Rogaland
Stavanger
2009 establishments in Norway
Tunnels completed in 2009